Jug & Dodo is a 1972 double album featuring pianist Dodo Marmarosa and saxophonist Gene Ammons. It was recorded in 1962, but was not released until ten years later, on the Prestige label.

Reception
The AllMusic review by Scott Yanow stated: "This historical curiosity contains plenty of hard-swinging performances and is worth picking up".

Track listing 
 "Georgia" (Hoagy Carmichael, Stuart Gorrell) - 5:35     
 "For You" (Johnny Burke, Al Dubin) - 4:26     
 "You're Driving Me Crazy" (Walter Donaldson) - 6:48     
 "Where or When" (Lorenz Hart, Richard Rodgers) - 6:57     
 "The Song Is You" (Oscar Hammerstein II, Jerome Kern) - 7:36     
 "Just Friends" (John Klenner, Sam M. Lewis) - 5:20     
 "Yardbird Suite" [take 1] (Charlie Parker) - 3:54     
 "Yardbird Suite" [take 2] (Parker) - 4:23     
 "I Remember You" (Johnny Mercer, Victor Schertzinger) - 3:45     
 "Bluzarumba" (Gene Ammons) - 3:34     
 "The Moody Blues" (Dodo Marmarosa) - 4:13     
 "Falling in Love with Love" [take 1] (Hart, Rodgers) - 4:56     
 "Falling in Love With Love" (Hart, Rodgers) - 3:38     
 "The Very Thought of You" (Ray Noble) - 4:02

Personnel 
Gene Ammons - tenor saxophone (tracks 1–4, 10, 12 & 13) 
Dodo Marmarosa - piano 
Sam Jones - bass
Marshall Thompson - drums

References 

Gene Ammons albums
Dodo Marmarosa albums
1972 albums
Prestige Records albums
Collaborative albums